Henderson High School may refer to:

In New Zealand
Henderson High School, Auckland  – Henderson, New Zealand

In the United States of America
Henderson High School (Mississippi) – Starkville, Mississippi
Henderson High School (North Carolina) – Henderson, North Carolina
Henderson High School (Pennsylvania) – West Chester, Pennsylvania
Henderson High School (Texas) – Henderson, Texas
Charles Henderson High School – Troy, Alabama
Henderson High School (Georgia) – former school in Chamblee, Georgia
Henderson County High School – Henderson, Kentucky
Le Sueur-Henderson Secondary School – Le Sueur, Minnesota
East Henderson High School – East Flat Rock, North Carolina
North Henderson High School – Hendersonville, North Carolina
West Henderson High School – Hendersonville, North Carolina
Henderson Independent High School – Salisbury, North Carolina

See also
 Hendersonville High School (disambiguation)